

Events

January–March 
 January 1 – Haiti gains independence from France, and becomes the first black republic, having the only successful slave revolt ever.
 February 4 – The Sokoto Caliphate is founded in West Africa.
 February 14 – The First Serbian uprising begins the Serbian Revolution. By 1817, the Principality of Serbia proclaims self-rule from the Ottoman Empire, the first nation-state in Europe to do so.
 February 15 – New Jersey becomes the last of the northern United States to abolish slavery.
 February 16 – First Barbary War: Stephen Decatur leads a raid to burn the pirate-held frigate  at Tripoli to deny her further use by the captors.
 February 18 – Ohio University is chartered by the Ohio General Assembly.
 February 21 – Cornishman Richard Trevithick's newly built Penydarren steam locomotive operates on the Merthyr Tramroad, between Penydarren in Merthyr Tydfil and Abercynon in South Wales, following several trials since February 13, the world's first locomotive to work on rails.
 February 22 – April 22 – 1804 Haiti massacre, an ethnic cleansing with the goal of eradicating the white population on Haiti.
 March 4–5 – The Castle Hill convict rebellion breaks out in New South Wales, led by Irish convicts in Australia.
 March 7 – In Britain:
 John Wedgwood founds the Royal Horticultural Society.
 Thomas Charles is instrumental in founding the British and Foreign Bible Society.
 March 10 – Louisiana Purchase, Three Flags Day: In St. Louis, a formal ceremony is conducted to transfer ownership of Louisiana Territory from France to the United States.
 March 17 – Friedrich Schiller's play Wilhelm Tell, is first performed at Weimar, under the direction of Johann Wolfgang von Goethe.
 March 21 – The Napoleonic Code is adopted as French civil law.

April–June 
 April 2 – Forty merchantmen are wrecked, when a convoy led by  runs aground off Portugal.
 April 4 – Samuel Taylor Coleridge, aboard The Speedwell, sails to the Mediterranean.
 April 5 – The High Possil meteorite, the first recorded meteorite to fall in Scotland in modern times, falls at High Possil.
 April 26 – Henry Addington resigns as Prime Minister of the United Kingdom.
 May 10 – William Pitt the Younger begins his second term as Prime Minister of the United Kingdom.
 May 14 – The Lewis and Clark Expedition departs from Camp Dubois, and begins their historic journey by traveling up the Missouri River.
 May 18 – Napoleon Bonaparte is proclaimed Emperor of the French by the French Senate.
 May 21 – Père Lachaise Cemetery a  cemetery in Paris, France is opened.
 June 9 – Beethoven's Symphony No. 3 in E–flat premiered in Vienna.
 June 15 – The Twelfth Amendment to the U.S. Constitution is ratified by New Hampshire, and arguably becomes effective (subsequently vetoed by the Governor of New Hampshire).
 June 21 – Smithson Tennant announces the discovery of the elements iridium and osmium; three days later, William Hyde Wollaston reveals to the Royal Society that he is the formerly anonymous discoverer of palladium.

July–September 
 July 11 – Aaron Burr, Vice President of the United States, shoots former U.S. Secretary of the Treasury Alexander Hamilton during a duel; Hamilton dies the next day.
 July 27 – The Twelfth Amendment to the U.S. Constitution, which reformed the way that candidates for President and Vice President are chosen, is ratified by Tennessee, removing doubt surrounding adoption.
 August 11 – In reaction to Napoleon being proclaimed emperor of France, Francis II assumes the title of a hereditary emperor of Austria (as Francis I) in addition to his title as emperor of the Holy Roman Empire. This latter title will become obsolete two years later when the formation of the Confederation of the Rhine instigated by Napoleon signals the end of the Holy Roman Empire.
 August 20 – Lewis and Clark Expedition: The Corps of Discovery, whose purpose is to explore the Louisiana Purchase, suffers its only death when Sergeant Charles Floyd dies, apparently from acute appendicitis.
 September 1 – German astronomer K. L. Harding discovers the asteroid Juno.

October–December 
 October 5 – Action of 5 October 1804: War between Spain and the United Kingdom is triggered by the battle between four British warships (Indefatigable, Medusa, Amphion and Lively) and four Spanish frigates (Medee, Fama, Clara and Mercedes), all carrying treasure and merchandise.  Captain Graham Moore of Indefatigable informs Spanish Admiral Jose Bustamante of his orders to detain the treasure-laden ships and, "not receiving a satisfactory answer, an Action commenced"; La Mercedes is sunk and the other three ships surrender.
 October 8 – Jean-Jacques Dessalines holds his coronation as Jean-Jacques I, Emperor of Haiti.
 November 3 – The Treaty of St. Louis is signed by Quashquame and William Henry Harrison; controversy surrounding the treaty eventually causes the Sauk people to ally with the British during the War of 1812, and is the main cause of the Black Hawk War of 1832.
 November 20 – Said bin Sultan, Sultan of Muscat and Oman, starts to rule.
 November 30 – The Democratic-Republican-controlled United States Senate begins an impeachment trial against Federalist-partisan Supreme Court of the United States Justice Samuel Chase, on charges of political bias (he is acquitted by the United States Senate of all charges on March 1, 1805).

 December 2 – Coronation of Napoleon I: At the cathedral of Notre Dame de Paris, Napoleon crowns himself as the first Emperor of the French in a thousand years. Witnessing this, Simón Bolívar dedicates himself to liberating Venezuela from Spanish rule.
 December 3 – Thomas Jefferson defeats Charles C. Pinckney in the United States presidential election.
 December 12 – Spain declares war on the United Kingdom.

Date unknown 
 The Nguyễn dynasty emperor Gia Long changes his country's official name from Đại Việt to Việt Nam.
 Morphine is first isolated from the opium poppy by the German pharmacist, Friedrich Sertürner.
 Matthew Flinders recommends that New Holland be renamed Australia (from the Latin "australis" meaning "of the south").
 Shimizu-gumi, as predecessor for Shimizu Corporation, a major construction company of Japan, founded in Kanda region, Edo. (now Tokyo) 
 World population reaches 1 billion people.

Births

January–June 

 January 1 – James Fannin, Texas revolutionary (d. 1836)
 January 9
 Louis d'Aurelle de Paladines, French general (d. 1877)
 Sydney Dacres, British admiral (d. 1884)
 January 10 – Élie Frédéric Forey, French general, Marshal of France (d. 1872)
 January 20 – Eugène Sue, French novelist (d. 1857)
 January 21 – Eliza Roxcy Snow, American poet (d. 1887)
 February – James Bronterre O'Brien, Irish-born Chartist (d. 1864)
 February 5 – J. L. Runeberg, Finnish national poet (d. 1877)
 February 7 – John Deere, American industrialist (d. 1886)
 February 13  – Claude-Étienne Minié, French army officer and weapon inventor (d. 1879)
 February 29 – Carl von Rokitansky, Czech physician and pathologist (d. 1878)
 March 8 – Alvan Clark, American telescope manufacturer (d. 1887)
 March 14 – Johann Strauss Senior, Austrian composer (d. 1849)
 March 17 – Jim Bridger, American trapper and explorer (d. 1881)
 March 20 – Neal Dow, mayor of Portland and Father of Prohibition (d. 1897)
 April 3 – Lucien Baudens, French military surgeon (d. 1857)
 April 4 – Andrew Nicholl, Northern Irish painter (d. 1886)
 April 26 – Charles Goodyear, American politician (d. 1876)
 May 4 – Margaretta Riley, British botanic (d. 1899)
 May 13 – Per Gustaf Svinhufvud af Qvalstad, Swedo-Finnish treasurer of Tavastia province, manor host, and paternal grandfather of President P. E. Svinhufvud (d. 1866)
 May 16 – Elizabeth Peabody, Transcendental activist, educator (d. 1894)
 June 1
 Mikhail Glinka, Russian composer (d. 1857)
 George Sand, French writer (d. 1876)
 June 24 – Willard Richards, American religious leader (d. 1854)

July–December 

 July 4 – Nathaniel Hawthorne, American writer (d. 1864)
 July 6 – Jerónimo Carrión, 8th President of Ecuador (d. 1873)
 July 14 – Ludwig von Benedek, Austrian general (d. 1881)
 July 20 – Richard Owen, English anatomist, paleontologist, and zoologist (d. 1892)
 July 23 – Jane Irwin Harrison, de facto First Lady of the United States (d. 1846)
 July 28 – Ludwig Feuerbach, German philosopher (d. 1872)
 September 5 – William Alexander Graham, United States Senator from North Carolina (1840–1843), Confederate States Senator (1864–1865) (d. 1875)
 September 8 – Eduard Mörike, German poet (d. 1875)
 September 11 – Mercedes Marín del Solar, international Chilean poet and reform educator (d. 1866)
 September 14
 Louis Désiré Maigret, Roman Catholic bishop of Honolulu (d. 1882)
 John Gould, English ornithologist (d. 1881)
 October 18 – Mongkut, Rama IV, King of Siam (d. 1868)
 October 24 – Wilhelm Eduard Weber, German physicist  (d. 1891)
 November 18 – Alfonso Ferrero La Marmora, Italian general and statesman (d. 1878)
 November 23 – Franklin Pierce, 14th President of the United States (d. 1869)
 December 7 – Noah Haynes Swayne, Associate Justice of the Supreme Court of the United States (d. 1884)
 December 10 – Carl Gustav Jacob Jacobi, German mathematician (d. 1851)
 December 13 – Joseph Howe, Canadian politician (d. 1873)
 December 16 – Viktor Bunyakovsky, Ukrainian-Russian mathematician (d. 1889)
 December 21 – Benjamin Disraeli, Prime Minister of the United Kingdom (d. 1881)
 December 23 – Charles Augustin Sainte-Beuve, French literary critic (d. 1869)

Date unknown
 Isaac Aaron, English-born physician, owner of the Australian Medical Journal and secretary of the Australian Medical Association (d. 1877)
 James Fannin, colonel in Army of the Republic of Texas and slave trader (executed 1836)
 Hortense Globensky-Prévost, Canadian heroine (d. 1873)
 Anne Hill, British-Canadian dancer and actor (d. 1896)
 Chō Kōran, Japanese poet and painter (d. 1879)
 Eugénie Luce, French educator (d. 1882)
 James Mackay, Scottish-born New Zealand politician (d. 1875)

Deaths

January–June 

 January 4 – Charlotte Ramsey Lennox, British author and poet (b. 1727)
 January 15 – Dru Drury, English entomologist (b. 1725)
 February 3 – Sir Edward Blackett, 4th Baronet, English politician (b. 1719)
 February 6 – Joseph Priestley, British chemist (b. 1733)
 February 7 – William Bingham, American Continental congressman, senator for Pennsylvania (b. 1752)
 February 12 – Immanuel Kant, German philosopher (b. 1724)
 March 3 – Giovanni Domenico Tiepolo, painter (b. 1727)
 March 13 – Damodar Pande, Prime Minister of Nepal (b. 1752)
 March 16 – Henrik Gabriel Porthan Finnish writer and historian (b. 1739)
 March 21 – Louis Antoine, Duke of Enghien (executed) (b. 1772)
 March 30 – Victor-François, 2nd duc de Broglie, Marshal of France (b. 1718)
 April 9 – Jacques Necker, French statesman (b. 1732)
 April 11 – Miklós Küzmics, Hungarian Slovenes writer, Catholic priest (b. 1737)
 April 15 – Jean-Charles Pichegru, French general (strangled in prison) (b. 1761)
 May 25 – Johann Joachim Spalding, German theologian (b. 1714)

July–December 
 July 12 – Alexander Hamilton, American statesman and Founding Father (killed in a duel) (b. 1755 or 1757)
 September 4 – Richard Somers, American naval officer (killed in battle) (b. 1778)
 September 20 – Pierre Méchain, French astronomer (b. 1744)
 October 2 – Nicolas-Joseph Cugnot, French steam vehicle pioneer (b. 1725)
 October 8 – Thomas Cochran (judge), Canadian judge (b. 1777)
 October 29 – Sarah Crosby, the first female Methodist preacher (b. 1729)
 November 1 – Johann Friedrich Gmelin, German naturalist (b. 1748)
 November 5 – Maria Anna Adamberger, Austrian actress (b. 1752)
 November 18 – Philip Schuyler, general in the American Revolution, a United States senator from New York, father of Angelica Schuyler Church and Elizabeth Schuyler Hamilton, father-in-law of Alexander Hamilton (b. 1733)
 November 23 – Richard Graves, English writer (b. 1715)
 December 18 – Jacob ben Wolf Kranz, Lithuanian maggid (b. c. 1740)
 December 25 – Contarina Barbarigo, famous Venetian noble.

References 

 
Leap years in the Gregorian calendar